Kazimierz Jurek (born 2 March 1964), is a Polish former ice hockey player. He played for HC Gap, Bordeaux Gironde Hockey 2000, Hockey Club de Reims, and Brest Albatros Hockey during his career. He also played for the Polish national team at the 1992 Winter Olympics and the 1992 World Championship. During the 1984 World Junior Championships Pool B tournament, held in Caen, France, Jurek defected and remained in France.

References

External links
 

1964 births
Living people
Boxers de Bordeaux players
Brest Albatros Hockey players
Hockey Club de Reims players
Ice hockey players at the 1992 Winter Olympics
Olympic ice hockey players of Poland
People from Nowy Targ
Sportspeople from Lesser Poland Voivodeship
Polish defectors
Polish emigrants to France
Polish ice hockey defencemen
Rapaces de Gap players